Aaron Mosessohn (died 1780) was a German rabbi.

Biography
Aaron Mosessohn was likely born in Glogau, and was a descendant of the Tzvi family. His great-grandfather was the noted Talmudist Shabbethai Cohen.

In 1763 he was elected rabbi of Berlin, having previously been rabbi of Dessau. Under the title Aaron Mosessohn's Friedenspredigt (Berlin, 1763), Mendelssohn published a thanksgiving sermon which Mosessohn had written after the peace of Hubertsburg in 1763. It was reprinted in Mendelssohn's Gesammelte Schriften (vi. 407–415), and in Hebrew in Ha-Me'assef, (1789, pp. 14–24).

Aaron edited He-ʻArukh mi-Shakh (Berlin, 1767), the commentary of Shabbethai Cohen on the Shulḥan ʻArukh Yoreh De'ah, to which he added notes of his own. About 1771 he accepted the rabbinate of Schwabach, with which the office of chief rabbi of the principality of Ansbach was united. Upon his recommendation the congregation of Berlin conferred upon Mendelssohn honorary membership on April 3, 1771.

Publications

References

External links
 

1780 deaths
18th-century German rabbis
German sermon writers
People from Głogów